The Bureau of the Pan-African Parliament is the essential leadership of the Pan-African Parliament (PAP), consisting of one President and four Vice-Presidents.

The President and each Vice-President represent a different region of Africa. The current members of the Bureau are:
President –Roger Nkodo Dang from Cameroon, representing Central Africa
First Vice-President –Stephen Masele from Tanzania, representing East Africa
Second Vice-President – Haidara Cisse from Mali, representing West Africa
Third Vice-President – Bouras Djamel from Algeria, representing North Africa
Fourth Vice-President – Chief F. Z. Charumbira from Zimbabwe, representing Southern Africa
The Bureau is responsible for:
 The management and administration of the affairs and facilities of Parliament and its organs.
 Regulating the procedures relating to the financial, organisational and administrative needs in accordance with Financial Rules of the AU and matters concerning Members and the internal organisation of Parliament and its organs.
 Determining the draft agenda and the programmes of the sessions of Parliament.
 Determining the establishment, plan and structure of the Secretariat and lay down regulations for the staff, including their terms and conditions of service.
 Proposing to Parliament for adoption the establishment and job descriptions of its support staff.
 Proposing, to the Pan African Parliament, the appointment of the Clerk and Deputy Clerks to Parliament.
 The preparation of the draft budget and its presentation to the responsible Committee.
 Coordinating and harmonising the functions of Permanent Committees.
 Any other matters in accordance with the directives issued by Parliament.

Carrying out any other functions as may be prescribed by Parliament or incidental to these functions.

List of presidents

List of Bureaus with representatives by region
Legend:    President -  Vice-president

See also
Pan-African Parliament

References

External links
Pan-African Parliament Bureau

Pan-African Parliament